Nuff Crisis! is a studio album by the Jamaican reggae group Culture, released in 1988.

Production
The album was produced by Lloyd Evans, with song arrangements by the Jamaican musicians Sly & Robbie. Culture was backed by the Roots Radics band; the group made it a point to avoid the then-trendy computerized sound of 1980s reggae production.

Critical reception

The Chicago Tribune called the album "a monster dance record," writing that "Joseph Hill's deep, soul-searching voice is as expressive as that of Bob Marley or Burning Spear's Winston Rodney, while the harmonies of Albert Walker and Kenneth Dayes shadow every syllable." The Washington Post wrote: "Never has the rhythm been so muscular; never have the vocal and horn harmonies sounded so full and satisfying. Hill's songs about backbiting in the black community, jumping into the 'Frying Pan' of adulthood and his own straying into temptation are as distinctively personal as they are catchily soulful."

AllMusic thought that "with the digital sounds of ragga in vogue and many of Culture's contemporaries taking a more commercial route, it was refreshing to find a group sticking to what they do best."

Track listing

Personnel
Kenneth Dayes - vocals
Joseph Hill - vocals
Albert Walker - vocals

References

Culture (band) albums
1988 albums
Shanachie Records albums